Sansarc is an unincorporated community in Stanley County, in the U.S. state of South Dakota.

History
A post office called Sansarc was established in 1906, and remained in operation until 1954. The community took its name from nearby Sansarc Creek.

References

Unincorporated communities in Stanley County, South Dakota
Unincorporated communities in South Dakota